Kropswolde (abbreviation: Kw) is an unstaffed railway station in Foxhol near Kropswolde in the Netherlands. The station was opened on 1 May 1868 and is located on the Harlingen–Nieuweschans railway between Groningen Europapark and Martenshoek in the province of Groningen. Train services are operated by Arriva.

Location 
The railway station is located at the Woldweg in the village of Foxhol, just north of the village of Kropswolde, both part of the municipality of Midden-Groningen, in the province of Groningen in the northeast of the Netherlands. It is situated on the Harlingen–Nieuweschans railway between the railway stations of Groningen Europapark and Martenshoek.

History 
The original station building was completed in 1865. The Harlingen–Nieuweschans railway between Groningen and Winschoten including Kropswolde was opened on 1 May 1868. The original station building was replaced by the current building in 1915.

Building and layout 

The station building is owned by NS Stations. It has been a national heritage site since 2001.

The unelectrified double track railway passes through the station from west to east. At the station, there are two tracks with a platform each: platform 1 is north of the northern track and platform 2 is south of the southern track. The platforms are separated by a level crossing of the public road.

Train services

Bus services
There are no bus services at this station. The nearest bus stop is in Hoogezand.

References

External links

 Kropswolde station, station information

1865 establishments in the Netherlands
Buildings and structures completed in 1865
Railway stations opened in 1915
Buildings and structures demolished in 1915
Railway stations in Groningen (province)
Railway stations on the Staatslijn B
Railway stations opened in 1868
Rijksmonuments in Groningen (province)
Transport in Midden-Groningen
Railway stations in the Netherlands opened in the 19th century